Emilio Lorenzo Stehle (September 9, 1926 – May 16, 2017) was a German cleric who served as a Catholic bishop in Ecuador.

Born in Germany, Stehle was ordained to the priesthood in 1951. Stehle served auxiliary bishop of the Roman Catholic Archdiocese of Quito, Ecuador, from 1983 to 1986. He then served as bishop of the Roman Catholic Diocese of Santo Domingo de los Colorados from 1987 to 2002.

Stehle died on May 16, 2017.

When journalistic investigations revealed in 2021 that Stehle had used the office to facilitate the escape of priests accused of abusing minors, the Roman Catholic Diocese of Hildesheim commissioned an investigation. Moreover, allegations of abuse against Stehle himself have shocked Germany. Stehle also allegedly facilitated the transfer of accused priests in Germany to Latin America.

Notes

1926 births
2017 deaths
German Roman Catholic bishops in South America
German expatriates in Ecuador
Commanders Crosses of the Order of Merit of the Federal Republic of Germany
Roman Catholic bishops of Santo Domingo de los Colorados
Roman Catholic bishops of Quito